Publius Vergilius Maro (traditional dates 15 October 7021 September 19 BC), usually called Virgil or Vergil in English, was an ancient Roman poet of the Augustan period. He composed three of the most famous poems in Latin literature: the Eclogues (or Bucolics), the Georgics, and the epic Aeneid. A number of minor poems, collected in the Appendix Vergiliana, were attributed to him in ancient times, but modern scholars consider his authorship of these poems as dubious.

Virgil's work has had wide and deep influence on Western literature, most notably Dante's Divine Comedy, in which Virgil appears as the author's guide through Hell and Purgatory.

Virgil has been traditionally ranked as one of Rome's greatest poets. His Aeneid is also considered a national epic of ancient Rome, a title held since composition.

Life and works

Birth and biographical tradition
Virgil's biographical tradition is thought to depend on a lost biography by the Roman poet Varius. This biography was incorporated into an account by the historian Suetonius, as well as the later commentaries of Servius and Donatus (the two great commentators on Virgil's poetry). Although the commentaries record much factual information about Virgil, some of their evidence can be shown to rely on allegorizing and on inferences drawn from his poetry. For this reason, details regarding Virgil's life story are considered somewhat problematic.

According to these accounts, Publius Vergilius Maro was born in the village of Andes, near Mantua in Cisalpine Gaul (northern Italy, added to Italy proper during his lifetime). Analysis of his name has led some to believe that he descended from earlier Roman colonists. Modern speculation, however, ultimately is not supported by narrative evidence from either his own writings or his later biographers. Macrobius says that Virgil's father was of a humble background, though scholars generally believe that Virgil was from an equestrian landowning family who could afford to give him an education. He attended schools in Cremona, Mediolanum, Rome, and Naples. After briefly considering a career in rhetoric and law, the young Virgil turned his talents to poetry.

According to Robert Seymour Conway, the only ancient source which reports the actual distance between Andes and Mantua is a surviving fragment from the works of Marcus Valerius Probus. Probus flourished during the reign of Nero (AD 54–68). Probus reports that Andes was located 30 Roman miles from Mantua.

Relatively little is known about the family of Virgil. His father reportedly belonged to gens Vergilia, and his mother belonged to gens Magia. According to Conway, gens Vergilia is poorly attested in inscriptions from the entire Northern Italy, where Mantua is located. Among thousands of surviving ancient inscriptions from this region, there are only 8 or 9 mentions of individuals called "Vergilius" (masculine) or "Vergilia" (feminine). Out of these mentions, three appear in inscriptions from Verona, and one in an inscription from Calvisano.

Conway theorized that the inscription from Calvisano had to do with a kinswoman of Virgil. Calvisano is located 30 Roman miles from Mantua, and would fit with Probus's description of Andes. The inscription, in this case, is a votive offering to the Matronae (a group of deities) by a woman called Vergilia, asking the goddesses to deliver from danger another woman, called Munatia. Conway notes that the offering belongs to a common type for this era, where women made requests for deities to preserve the lives of female loved ones who were pregnant and were about to give birth. In most cases, the woman making the request was the mother of a woman who was pregnant or otherwise in danger. Though there is another inscription from Calvisano, where a woman asks the deities to preserve the life of her sister. Munatia, the woman whom Vergilia wished to protect, was likely a close relative of Vergilia, possibly her daughter. The name "Munatia" indicates that this woman was a member of gens Munatia, and makes it likely that Vergilia married into this family.

Other studies claim that today's consideration for ancient Andes should be sought in the area (Casalpoglio) of Castel Goffredo.

Early works

According to the commentators, Virgil received his first education when he was five years old and later went to Cremona, Milan, and finally Rome to study rhetoric, medicine, and astronomy, which he would abandon for philosophy. From Virgil's admiring references to the neoteric writers Pollio and Cinna, it has been inferred that he was, for a time, associated with Catullus's neoteric circle. According to Servius, schoolmates considered Virgil extremely shy and reserved, and he was nicknamed "Parthenias" ("virgin") because of his social aloofness. Virgil also seems to have suffered bad health throughout his life and in some ways lived the life of an invalid. According to the Catalepton, he began to write poetry while in the Epicurean school of Siro in Naples. A group of small works attributed to the youthful Virgil by the commentators survive collected under the title Appendix Vergiliana, but are largely considered spurious by scholars. One, the Catalepton, consists of fourteen short poems, some of which may be Virgil's, and another, a short narrative poem titled the Culex ("The Gnat"), was attributed to Virgil as early as the 1st century AD.

Eclogues

The biographical tradition asserts that Virgil began the hexameter Eclogues (or Bucolics) in 42 BC and it is thought that the collection was published around 39–38 BC, although this is controversial. The Eclogues (from the Greek for "selections") are a group of ten poems roughly modeled on the bucolic (that is, "pastoral" or "rural") poetry  of the Hellenistic poet Theocritus, which were written in dactylic hexameter. After defeating the army led by the assassins of Julius Caesar in the Battle of Philippi (42 BC), Octavian tried to pay off his veterans with land expropriated from towns in northern Italy, which—according to tradition—included an estate near Mantua belonging to Virgil. The loss of Virgil's family farm and the attempt through poetic petitions to regain his property have traditionally been seen as his motives in the composition of the Eclogues. This is now thought to be an unsupported inference from interpretations of the Eclogues. In Eclogues 1 and 9, Virgil indeed dramatizes the contrasting feelings caused by the brutality of the land expropriations through pastoral idiom but offers no indisputable evidence of the supposed biographic incident. While some readers have identified the poet himself with various characters and their vicissitudes, whether gratitude by an old rustic to a new god (Ecl. 1), frustrated love by a rustic singer for a distant boy (his master's pet, Ecl. 2), or a master singer's claim to have composed several eclogues (Ecl. 5), modern scholars largely reject such efforts to garner biographical details from works of fiction, preferring to interpret an author's characters and themes as illustrations of contemporary life and thought.

The ten Eclogues present traditional pastoral themes with a fresh perspective. Eclogues 1 and 9 address the land confiscations and their effects on the Italian countryside. 2 and 3 are pastoral and erotic, discussing both homosexual love (Ecl. 2) and attraction toward people of any gender (Ecl. 3). Eclogue 4, addressed to Asinius Pollio, the so-called "Messianic Eclogue", uses the imagery of the golden age in connection with the birth of a child (who the child was meant to be has been subject to debate). 5 and 8 describe the myth of Daphnis in a song contest, 6, the cosmic and mythological song of Silenus; 7, a heated poetic contest, and 10 the sufferings of the contemporary elegiac poet Cornelius Gallus. Virgil is credited in the Eclogues with establishing Arcadia as a poetic ideal that still resonates in Western literature and visual arts, and setting the stage for the development of Latin pastoral by Calpurnius Siculus, Nemesianus and later writers.

Georgics

Sometime after the publication of the Eclogues (probably before 37 BC), Virgil became part of the circle of Maecenas, Octavian's capable agent d'affaires who sought to counter sympathy for Antony among the leading families by rallying Roman literary figures to Octavian's side. Virgil came to know many of the other leading literary figures of the time, including Horace, in whose poetry he is often mentioned, and Varius Rufus, who later helped finish the Aeneid.

At Maecenas's insistence (according to the tradition) Virgil spent the ensuing years (perhaps 37–29 BC) on the long dactylic hexameter poem called the Georgics (from Greek, "On Working the Earth"), which he dedicated to Maecenas.

The ostensible theme of the Georgics is instruction in the methods of running a farm. In handling this theme, Virgil follows in the didactic ("how to") tradition of the Greek poet Hesiod's Works and Days and several works of the later Hellenistic poets.

The four books of the Georgics focus respectively on:
 raising crops;
 raising trees;
 livestock and horses;
 beekeeping and the qualities of bees.

Well-known passages include the beloved Laus Italiae of Book 2, the prologue description of the temple in Book 3, and the description of the plague at the end of Book 3. Book 4 concludes with a long mythological narrative, in the form of an epyllion which describes vividly the discovery of beekeeping by Aristaeus and the story of Orpheus' journey to the underworld.

Ancient scholars, such as Servius, conjectured that the Aristaeus episode replaced, at the emperor's request, a long section in praise of Virgil's friend, the poet Gallus, who was disgraced by Augustus, and who committed suicide in 26 BC.

The tone of the Georgics tone wavers between optimism and pessimism, sparking critical debate on the poet's intentions, but the work lays the foundations for later didactic poetry. Virgil and Maecenas are said to have taken turns reading the Georgics to Octavian upon his return from defeating Antony and Cleopatra at the Battle of Actium in 31 BC.

Aeneid

The Aeneid is widely considered Virgil's finest work, and is regarded as one of the most important poems in the history of Western literature (T. S. Eliot referred to it as 'the classic of all Europe'). The work (modelled after Homer's Iliad and Odyssey) chronicles a refugee of the Trojan War, named Aeneas, as he struggles to fulfill his destiny. His intentions are to reach Italy, where his descendants Romulus and Remus are to found the city of Rome.

Virgil worked on the Aeneid during the last eleven years of his life (29–19 BC), commissioned, according to Propertius, by Augustus. The epic poem consists of 12 books in dactylic hexameter verse which describe the journey of Aeneas, a warrior fleeing the sack of Troy, to Italy, his battle with the Italian prince Turnus, and the foundation of a city from which Rome would emerge. The Aeneid's first six books describe the journey of Aeneas from Troy to Rome. Virgil made use of several models in the composition of his epic; Homer, the pre-eminent author of classical epic, is everywhere present, but Virgil also makes special use of the Latin poet Ennius and the Hellenistic poet Apollonius of Rhodes among the various other writers to which he alludes. Although the Aeneid casts itself firmly into the epic mode, it often seeks to expand the genre by including elements of other genres such as tragedy and aetiological poetry. Ancient commentators noted that Virgil seems to divide the Aeneid into two sections based on the poetry of Homer; the first six books were viewed as employing the Odyssey as a model while the last six were connected to the Iliad.

Book 1 (at the head of the Odyssean section) opens with a storm which Juno, Aeneas's enemy throughout the poem, stirs up against the fleet. The storm drives the hero to the coast of Carthage, which historically was Rome's deadliest foe. The queen, Dido, welcomes the ancestor of the Romans, and under the influence of the gods falls deeply in love with him. At a banquet in Book 2, Aeneas tells the story of the sack of Troy, the death of his wife, and his escape, to the enthralled Carthaginians, while in Book 3 he recounts to them his wanderings over the Mediterranean in search of a suitable new home. Jupiter in Book 4 recalls the lingering Aeneas to his duty to found a new city, and he slips away from Carthage, leaving Dido to commit suicide, cursing Aeneas and calling down revenge in symbolic anticipation of the fierce wars between Carthage and Rome. In Book 5, funeral games are celebrated for Aeneas's father Anchises, who had died a year before. On reaching Cumae, in Italy in Book 6, Aeneas consults the Cumaean Sibyl, who conducts him through the Underworld where Aeneas meets the dead Anchises who reveals Rome's destiny to his son.

Book 7 (beginning the Iliadic half) opens with an address to the muse and recounts Aeneas's arrival in Italy and betrothal to Lavinia, daughter of King Latinus. Lavinia had already been promised to Turnus, the king of the Rutulians, who is roused to war by the Fury Allecto and Amata, Lavinia's mother. In Book 8, Aeneas allies with King Evander, who occupies the future site of Rome, and is given new armor and a shield depicting Roman history. Book 9 records an assault by Nisus and Euryalus on the Rutulians; Book 10, the death of Evander's young son Pallas; and 11 the death of the Volscian warrior princess Camilla and the decision to settle the war with a duel between Aeneas and Turnus. The Aeneid ends in Book 12 with the taking of Latinus's city, the death of Amata, and Aeneas's defeat and killing of Turnus, whose pleas for mercy are spurned. The final book ends with the image of Turnus's soul lamenting as it flees to the underworld.

Reception of the Aeneid

Critics of the Aeneid focus on a variety of issues. The tone of the poem as a whole is a particular matter of debate; some see the poem as ultimately pessimistic and politically subversive to the Augustan regime, while others view it as a celebration of the new imperial dynasty. Virgil makes use of the symbolism of the Augustan regime, and some scholars see strong associations between Augustus and Aeneas, the one as founder and the other as re-founder of Rome. A strong teleology, or drive towards a climax, has been detected in the poem. The Aeneid is full of prophecies about the future of Rome, the deeds of Augustus, his ancestors, and famous Romans, and the Carthaginian Wars; the shield of Aeneas even depicts Augustus's victory at Actium against Mark Antony and Cleopatra VII in 31 BC. A further focus of study is the character of Aeneas. As the protagonist of the poem, Aeneas seems to waver constantly between his emotions and commitment to his prophetic duty to found Rome; critics note the breakdown of Aeneas's emotional control in the last sections of the poem where the "pious" and "righteous" Aeneas mercilessly slaughters Turnus.

The Aeneid appears to have been a great success. Virgil is said to have recited Books 2, 4, and 6 to Augustus; and Book 6 apparently caused the emperor's sister Octavia to faint. Although the truth of this claim is subject to scholarly skepticism, it has served as a basis for later art, such as Jean-Baptiste Wicar's Virgil Reading the Aeneid.

Unfortunately, some lines of the poem were left unfinished, and the whole was unedited, at Virgil's death in 19 BC.

Virgil's death and editing of the Aeneid
According to the tradition, Virgil traveled to the senatorial province of Achaea in Greece in about 19 BC to revise the Aeneid. After meeting Augustus in Athens and deciding to return home, Virgil caught a fever while visiting a town near Megara. After crossing to Italy by ship, weakened with disease, Virgil died in Brundisium harbor on 21 September 19 BC. Augustus ordered Virgil's literary executors, Lucius Varius Rufus and Plotius Tucca, to disregard Virgil's own wish that the poem be burned, instead ordering it to be published with as few editorial changes as possible. As a result, the text of the Aeneid that exists may contain faults which Virgil was planning to correct before publication. However, the only obvious imperfections are a few lines of verse that are metrically unfinished (i.e. not a complete line of dactylic hexameter). Some scholars have argued that Virgil deliberately left these metrically incomplete lines for dramatic effect. Other alleged imperfections are subject to scholarly debate.

Legacy and reception

Antiquity 
The works of Virgil almost from the moment of their publication revolutionized Latin poetry. The Eclogues, Georgics, and above all the Aeneid became standard texts in school curricula with which all educated Romans were familiar. Poets following Virgil often refer intertextually to his works to generate meaning in their own poetry. The Augustan poet Ovid parodies the opening lines of the Aeneid in Amores 1.1.1–2, and his summary of the Aeneas story in Book 14 of the Metamorphoses, the so-called "mini-Aeneid", has been viewed as a particularly important example of post-Virgilian response to the epic genre. Lucan's epic, the Bellum Civile, has been considered an anti-Virgilian epic, disposing of the divine mechanism, treating historical events, and diverging drastically from Virgilian epic practice. The Flavian poet Statius in his 12-book epic Thebaid engages closely with the poetry of Virgil; in his epilogue he advises his poem not to "rival the divine Aeneid, but follow afar and ever venerate its footsteps." In Silius Italicus, Virgil finds one of his most ardent admirers. With almost every line of his epic Punica, Silius references Virgil. Indeed, Silius is known to have bought Virgil's tomb and worshipped the poet. Partially as a result of his so-called "Messianic" Fourth Ecloguewidely interpreted later to have predicted the birth of Jesus ChristVirgil was in later antiquity imputed to have the magical abilities of a seer; the Sortes Vergilianae, the process of using Virgil's poetry as a tool of divination, is found in the time of Hadrian, and continued into the Middle Ages. In a similar vein Macrobius in the Saturnalia credits the work of Virgil as the embodiment of human knowledge and experience, mirroring the Greek conception of Homer.  Virgil also found commentators in antiquity. Servius, a commentator of the 4th century AD, based his work on the commentary of Donatus. Servius's commentary provides us with a great deal of information about Virgil's life, sources, and references; however, many modern scholars find the variable quality of his work and the often simplistic interpretations frustrating.

Late antiquity 

Even as the Western Roman Empire collapsed, literate men acknowledged that Virgil was a master poet – Saint Augustine, for example, confessing how he had wept at reading the death of Dido. The best-known surviving manuscripts of Virgil's works include manuscripts from late antiquity such as the Vergilius Augusteus, the Vergilius Vaticanus and the Vergilius Romanus.

Middle Ages 
Gregory of Tours read Virgil, whom he quotes in several places, along with some other Latin poets, though he cautions that "we ought not to relate their lying fables, lest we fall under sentence of eternal death". In the Renaissance of the 12th century, Alexander Neckham placed the "divine" Aeneid on his standard arts curriculum, and Dido became the romantic heroine of the age. Monks like Maiolus of Cluny might repudiate what they called "the luxurious eloquence of Virgil", but they could not deny the power of his appeal.

Dante's Divine Comedy 
Dante presents Virgil as his guide through Hell and the greater part of Purgatory in the Divine Comedy. Dante also mentions Virgil in De vulgari eloquentia, as one of the four regulati poetae along with Ovid, Lucan and Statius (ii, vi, 7).

Purgatorio 
In Purgatorio 21, the pilgrim and Virgil encounter the shade of Statius, the author of the Thebaid. Statius claims that Virgil was his "mama ... and nurse in writing poetry", as well as wishing that he could have "lived back there while Virgil was alive". Virgil does not wish for Statius to know his true identity, and he turns to Dante with "a look that silently said: 'Be Silent". However, Dante smiles "like one who gives a hint", at the irony of the situation.  Statius misinterprets Dante's laughter for disdain, and Virgil comes forth to reveal himself. Upon learning his identity, Statius moves to embrace Virgil as a fellow poet; but Virgil says, "Brother, do not, for you are a shade, and a shade is what you see", since Statius is a Christian who "exceeds him in the order of grace". In Purgatorio 22, Statius claims that not only was Virgil his poetic inspiration but also that "through you [I became] a Christian", Statius having read Virgil's words in Eclogue 4 as a prophecy of Christ: "The age begins anew; justice / returns and the first human time, and a new / offspring comes down from Heaven."

Renaissance and early modernity 
The Renaissance saw a number of authors inspired to write epic in Virgil's wake: Edmund Spenser called himself the English Virgil; Paradise Lost was influenced by the example of the Aeneid; and later artists influenced by Virgil include Berlioz and Hermann Broch.

Legends
The legend of "Virgil in his basket" arose in the Middle Ages, and is often seen in art and mentioned in literature as part of the Power of Women literary topos, demonstrating the disruptive force of female attractiveness on men. In this story Virgil became enamored of a beautiful woman, sometimes described as the emperor's daughter or mistress and called Lucretia.  She played him along and agreed to an assignation at her house, which he was to sneak into at night by climbing into a large basket let down from a window.  When he did so he was hoisted only halfway up the wall and then left trapped there into the next day, exposed to public ridicule. The story paralleled that of Phyllis riding Aristotle.  Among other artists depicting the scene, Lucas van Leyden made a woodcut and later an engraving.

In the Middle Ages, Virgil's reputation was such that it inspired legends associating him with magic and prophecy. From at least the 3rd century, Christian thinkers interpreted Eclogue 4, which describes the birth of a boy ushering in a golden age, as a prediction of Jesus's birth. In consequence, Virgil came to be seen on a similar level to the Hebrew prophets of the Bible as one who had heralded Christianity. Relatedly, The Jewish Encyclopedia argues that medieval legends about the golem may have been inspired by Virgilian legends about the poet's apocryphal power to bring inanimate objects to life.

Possibly as early as the second century AD, Virgil's works were seen as having magical properties and were used for divination. In what became known as the Sortes Vergilianae ("Virgilian Lots"), passages would be selected at random and interpreted to answer questions. In the 12th century, starting around Naples but eventually spreading widely throughout Europe, a tradition developed in which Virgil was regarded as a great magician. Legends about Virgil and his magical powers remained popular for over two hundred years, arguably becoming as prominent as his writings themselves. Virgil's legacy in medieval Wales was such that the Welsh version of his name, Fferyllt or Pheryllt, became a generic term for magic-worker, and survives in the modern Welsh word for pharmacist, fferyllydd.

Virgil's tomb 
The structure known as "Virgil's tomb" is found at the entrance of an ancient Roman tunnel (aka ) in Piedigrotta, a district  from the centre of Naples, near the Mergellina harbor, on the road heading north along the coast to Pozzuoli. While Virgil was already the object of literary admiration and veneration before his death, in the Middle Ages his name became associated with miraculous powers, and for a couple of centuries his tomb was the destination of pilgrimages and veneration.

Spelling of name 
By the fourth or fifth century AD the original spelling Vergilius had been changed to Virgilius, and then the latter spelling spread to the modern European languages. This latter spelling persisted even though, as early as the 15th century, the classical scholar Poliziano had shown Vergilius to be the original spelling. Today, the anglicisations Vergil and Virgil are both considered acceptable.

There is some speculation that the spelling Virgilius might have arisen due to a pun, since virg- carries an echo of the Latin word for 'wand' (uirga), Vergil being particularly associated with magic in the Middle Ages. There is also a possibility that virg- is meant to evoke the Latin virgo ('virgin'); this would be a reference to the fourth Eclogue, which has a history of Christian, and specifically Messianic, interpretations.

See also
Quintus Caecilius Epirota
 Dante and Virgil in Hell (1822 painting)
 Dante, led by Virgil, Consoles the Souls of the Envious (1835 painting)
 Francesca da Rimini and Paolo Malatesta Appraised by Dante and Virgil (1835 painting)
 Dante and Virgil (1850 painting)
 The Barque of Dante (1858 painting)

References

Notes

Citations

Further reading
 Anderson, W. S., and L. N. Quartarone. 2002. Approaches to Teaching Vergil's Aeneid. New York: Modern Language Association.
 Buckham, Philip Wentworth, Joseph Spence, Edward Holdsworth, William Warburton, and John Jortin. 1825. Miscellanea Virgiliana: In Scriptis Maxime Eruditorum Virorum Varie Dispersa, in Unum Fasciculum Collecta. Cambridge: Printed for W. P. Grant.
Conway, R. S. [1914] 1915. "The Youth of Vergil." Bulletin of the John Rylands Library July 1915.
Farrell, J. 1991. Vergil's Georgics and the Traditions of Ancient Epic: The Art of Allusion in Literary History. New York: Oxford University Press.
—2001. "The Vergilian Century." Vergilius (1959–) 47:11–28. .
Farrell, J., and Michael C. J. Putnam, eds. 2010. A Companion to Vergil's Aeneid and Its Tradition, (Blackwell Companions to the Ancient World). Chichester, MA:  Wiley-Blackwell.
 Fletcher, K. F. B. 2014. Finding Italy: Travel, Nation and Colonization in Vergil's 'Aeneid'''. Ann Arbor: University of Michigan Press.
 Hardie, Philip R., ed. 1999. Virgil: Critical Assessments of Ancient Authors 1–4. New York: Routledge.
 Henkel, John. 2014. "Vergil Talks Technique: Metapoetic Arboriculture in 'Georgics' 2." Vergilius (1959–) 60:33–66. .
 Horsfall, N. 2016. The Epic Distilled: Studies in the Composition of the Aeneid. Oxford: Oxford University Press.
 Mack, S. 1978. Patterns of Time in Vergil. Hamden: Archon Books.
 Panoussi, V. 2009. Greek Tragedy in Vergil's "Aeneid": Ritual, Empire, and Intertext. Cambridge: Cambridge University Press.
 Quinn, S., ed. 2000. Why Vergil? A Collection of Interpretations. Wauconda: Bolchazy-Carducci.
 Rossi, A. 2004. Contexts of War: Manipulation of Genre in Virgilian Battle Narrative. Ann Arbor: University of Michigan Press.
 Sondrup, Steven P. 2009. "Virgil: From Farms to Empire: Kierkegaard's Understanding of a Roman Poet." In Kierkegaard and the Roman World, edited by J. B. Stewart. Farnham: Ashgate.
 Syed, Y. 2005. Vergil's Aeneid and the Roman Self: Subject and Nation in Literary Discourse. Ann Arbor: University of Michigan Press.
 Syson, A. 2013. Fama and Fiction in Vergil's 'Aeneid. Columbus: Ohio State University Press.

External linksCollected works 
 
 
 
 Works of Virgil at the Perseus Digital Library—Latin texts, translations, and commentaries
Aeneid, Eclogues, and Georgics translated by J. C. Greenough, 1900
Aeneid, translated by T. C. Williams, 1910
— translated by John Dryden, 1697
 Works of Virgil at Theoi Project
Aeneid, Eclogues and Georgics, translated by H. R. Fairclough, 1916
 Works of Virgil at Internet Sacred Texts Archive
Aeneid, translated by John Dryden, 1697
Eclogues and Georgics, translated by J. W. MacKail, 1934
 P. Vergilius Maro at The Latin Library
 Virgil's works—text, concordances, and frequency list.
 Virgil: The Major Texts: contemporary, line-by-line English translations of Eclogues, Georgics, and Aeneid.
  Virgil in the collection of Ferdinand, Duke of Calabria at Somni:
Publii Vergilii Maronis Opera Naples and Milan, 1450.
 Publii Vergilii Maronis Opera Italy, 14701499.
 Publii Vergilii Maronis Opera Milan, 1465.
 Lewis E 198 Opera at OPennBiography Suetonius: The Life of Virgil—an English translation.
 Vita Vergiliana [The Life of Virgil] by Aelius Donatus (in original Latin).
 Aelius Donatus's Life of Virgil, translated by David Wilson-Okamura
Vergil – A Biography (Project Gutenberg ed.), by Tenney Frank.
 Vergilian Chronology (in German).CommentaryThe Vergil Project.
 "A new Aeneid for the 21st century."—A review of Robert Fagles's new translation of the Aeneid in the TLS, 9 February 2007.
 Virgilmurder—Jean-Yves Maleuvre's website setting forth his theory that Virgil was murdered by Augustus.
 The Secret History of Virgil—contains selection on the magical legends and tall tales that circulated about Virgil in the Middle Ages.
 Interview with Virgil scholar Richard Thomas and poet David Ferry, who recently translated the Georgics—via ThoughtCast
 SORGLL: Aeneid, Bk I, 1–49 , read by Robert Sonkowsky
 SORGLL: Aeneid, Bk IV, 296–396 , read by Stephen DaitzBibliographies'''
 Comprehensive bibliographies on all three of Virgil's major works, downloadable in Word or pdf format
 Bibliography of works relating Vergil to the literature of the Hellenistic age
 A selective Bibliographical Guide to Vergil's Aeneid
 Virgil in Late Antiquity, the Middle Ages, and the Renaissance: an Online Bibliography

 
Writers from the Province of Mantua
Golden Age Latin writers
Ancient Roman writers
Ancient Roman poets
1st-century BC writers
1st-century BC Romans
1st-century BC Roman poets
Bucolic poets
Epic poets
Didactic poets
70 BC births
19 BC deaths